Wilder Graben may refer to following rivers of Thuringia, Germany:

Wilder Graben (Upper Austria), stream in Northern Limestone Alps, Upper Austria
Wilder Graben (Nesse), tributary of the Nesse
Wilder Graben (Seebach), tributary of the Seebach